Denis O'Brien (March 13, 1837 – May 18, 1909) was an American lawyer and politician.

Life
Denis O'Brien was born on a farm near Ogdensburg, New York on March 13, 1837. He was admitted to the bar in 1861, and commenced practice in Watertown. He was elected Mayor of Watertown in 1872.

He was New York State Attorney General from 1884 to 1887, elected on the Democrat ticket in 1883 and 1885.

In 1889, he was elected a judge of the New York Court of Appeals, was re-elected in 1903, and remained on the bench until the end of 1907 when he reached the constitutional age limit of 70 years.

He died from appendicitis at his home in Watertown on May 18, 1909.

His son John F. O'Brien also was a judge of the New York Court of Appeals.

References

Further reading
Denis O'Brien at Historical Society of the New York Courts

1837 births
1909 deaths
Judges of the New York Court of Appeals
New York State Attorneys General
Mayors of places in New York (state)
People from Ogdensburg, New York
Politicians from Watertown, New York
19th-century American judges